Dennis Fowler Hightower (born October 28, 1941 in Washington, D.C.), is a former United States Army officer, retired business executive, college educator, and public servant who was the United States Deputy Secretary of Commerce from August 11, 2009 to August 27, 2010.

Early life and education
He spent his formative years in Washington, D.C., and graduated from McKinley High School in 1958, at age 16, as class president. He entered Howard University that same year and graduated in 1962, at age 20, with a BS degree. While at Howard, he was a student leader; a student athlete (swimming, riflery and rowing); the top graduating senior and a Distinguished Military Graduate of the Army ROTC program; and a member of Kappa Delta Pi (National Education Honor Society), Scabbard and Blade (National Military Honor Society), and Kappa Alpha Psi fraternity.

Military service
Commissioned as a Regular Army 2d Lieutenant in June 1962, Hightower completed the US Army Ranger School and US Army Airborne School, and served in the 101st Airborne Division as a platoon leader, company commander, and S-3 air operations officer. Later,
he was trained in counterintelligence and field operations intelligence (HUMINT), and served in strategic and operational assignments in the US and abroad. While pursuing graduate studies in Soviet and Eastern Europe Affairs, Hightower was inducted into Pi Sigma Alpha (National Political Science Honor Society). 

Hightower served in Vietnam with the 199th Infantry Brigade (Separate) (Light) as: Intelligence Officer, 4th Bn/12th Infantry; Commanding Officer, 179th Military Intelligence Detachment; and as Intelligence Officer, 199th Infantry Brigade. He was promoted to the rank of Major in Vietnam at age 27. During his eight-year military career, he was awarded numerous individual decorations including 2 Bronze Star Medals, the Purple Heart Medal, 3 Air Medals, the Joint Service Commendation Medal, 5 Army Commendation Medals with "V" device for Valor in Combat, and the Republic of Vietnam Honor Medal (First Class). In addition, he was the recipient of four Unit Combat Awards, the Combat Infantryman Badge, Expert Infantryman Badge, Army Ranger Tab, and Senior Parachutist Badge.  Hightower resigned his commission in June 1970, after early selection to attend the United States Army Command and General Staff College.

Career
After his military service, Hightower joined Xerox, and two years later, he was awarded a fellowship to study at Harvard Business School, from which he earned his MBA in 1974. Following that, he was a senior associate/engagement manager at McKinsey & Company; vice president and general manager of General Electric's lighting business in Mexico; vice president of corporate strategy at Mattel; and managing director at Russell Reynolds Associates in Los Angeles.

In 1987, Hightower was recruited by The Walt Disney Company, where he served as president of Disney Consumer Products for Europe, Middle East and Africa, based in Paris. He grew the business - 42 countries, 16 subsidiaries and joint ventures throughout the region - to a seven-fold increase in revenues between 1987 and 1995; and led Disney's entry into Eastern Europe and the  Soviet Union prior to its demise (1987-1990), the Middle East (1992), and Post-apartheid South Africa (1994). Hightower later served as president of Walt Disney Television and Telecommunications, then Disney's largest division based on revenues and operating income. He retired in June 1996. When Hightower retired from The Walt Disney Company, he was among the ten highest-ranking African American executives in corporate America.

In July 1996, Hightower joined the faculty of Harvard Business School, initially as a Senior Lecturer (1996–97), and for three years thereafter as Professor of Management in the first year MBA program, where he focused on leadership, building emerging markets, and global general management. He also taught in senior executive programs in South Africa and the Middle East.

From 2000 to 2001, Hightower was CEO of Europe Online Networks, a privately held satellite-delivered interactive company based in Luxembourg.  He returned to the United States to be treated for cancer.

Over the years, Hightower has served on numerous corporate and not-for profit boards including: The TJX Companies, PanAmSat, PVH, Northwest Airlines, The Gillette Company, Domino's Pizza, Accenture, the Price Waterhouse Chairman's Advisory Council, and Brown Capital Management. In the public sector, he has served on the Defense Business Board, Overseas Private Investment Corporation (OPIC), Casey Family Programs, Harvard Business School Visiting Committee, Howard University Board of Trustees, Morehouse College Andrew Young Center for International Affairs, the Ron Brown Scholar Program, the Bert King Foundation, the Corcoran Gallery of Art and the French Heritage Society.  

He has been a guest lecturer on leadership at IMD in Switzerland, INSEAD in France, the London Business School, the United States Military Academy, the United States Military Academy Preparatory School, the National Association of Corporate Directors, and various private organizations in Brazil, India and Singapore. 

His travels for business and other purposes have taken him to 91 countries, and he has conducted negotiations with business and political leaders throughout the world.  His achievements in business have resulted in many awards bestowed by academic, business and civic organizations throughout the years.

Hightower was confirmed by unanimous vote by the United States Senate on August 7, 2009 to replace John J. Sullivan, who resigned from this office on January 20, 2009. As Deputy Secretary, Hightower functioned as the chief operating officer of a Department with a $17 billion budget and 55,000 employees; and was responsible for the day-to-day operations of the Department's twelve bureaus.  He was a member of the President's Management Council, the committee on foreign investment in the U.S., cabinet-level task forces dealing with the Recovery Act, broadband access, export controls, satellite acquisition, and selected national security matters; a representative to the Transatlantic Business Dialogue on trade deliberations with the EU; and a board member of OPIC. Commerce Secretary Gary Locke commented that "Hightower brought skills he had learned at the top levels of business to help shepherd some of Commerce's most complicated initiatives, including satellite acquisition, cybersecurity and the Recovery Act's Broadband Technology Opportunities Program. We deeply appreciated Dennis' service especially the mentoring he provided to senior Commerce managers. He took on some of Commerce's most difficult challenges, and in every case, those programs are on a better footing today because of his diligent work." In a White House Press Release on July 15, 2010, President Obama stated:  "I thank Dennis for his service to the country and to my administration. I appreciate his guidance and hard work on various important priorities, from expanding broadband Internet access across the country to reforming our export control system in a way that enhances our competitiveness and our security. I wish him the best in his future endeavors." Hightower resigned on August 27, 2010, due to a health-related matter, to return to the private sector.

References

External links 
 Dennis Hightower Profile Page on BigSpeak.com
 

1941 births
Harvard Business School alumni
Howard University alumni
Living people
Obama administration personnel
People from Washington, D.C.
United States Deputy Secretaries of Commerce